Cassette 3: The Marion Morrison Mixtape is the sixth mixtape by American rapper Jonwayne. It was released as a free digital download and cassette tape on July 30, 2013. It contains guest appearances from Jeremiah Jae, Oliver the 2nd, Zeroh, and Flying Lotus (as Captain Murphy).

Track listing

References 

2013 mixtape albums
Jonwayne albums